Konstantin Anatolyevich Konoplyov (born 13 May 1980) is a Russian former professional footballer.

Club career
He made his debut in the Russian Premier League in 2001 for FC Zenit St. Petersburg. He played 1 game for FC Zenit St. Petersburg in the UEFA Cup 2002–03.

Honours
 Russian Premier League runner-up: 2003.
 Russian Premier League bronze: 2001.
 Russian Cup finalist: 2002.

References

1980 births
Living people
Russian footballers
FC Zenit Saint Petersburg players
FC Torpedo Moscow players
FC Volgar Astrakhan players
FC Oryol players
Russian Premier League players
Association football midfielders
FC Dynamo Saint Petersburg players
FC Petrotrest players
FC Tekstilshchik Ivanovo players